402 Chloë (prov. designation:  or ) is a large main-belt asteroid. It was discovered by French astronomer Auguste Charlois on 21 March 1895 from Nice. The orbital plane is inclined at an angle of 11.8° to the plane of the ecliptic.

This asteroid spans a girth of approximately 54 km. It is classified as a K-type asteroid and is a Barbarian.

References

External links 
 Lightcurve plot of 402 Chloe, Palmer Divide Observatory, B. D. Warner (2009)
 Asteroid Lightcurve Database (LCDB), query form (info )
 Dictionary of Minor Planet Names, Google books
 Asteroids and comets rotation curves, CdR – Observatoire de Genève, Raoul Behrend
 Discovery Circumstances: Numbered Minor Planets (1)-(5000) – Minor Planet Center
 
 

Background asteroids
Chloe
Chloe
S-type asteroids (Tholen)
K-type asteroids (SMASS)
18950321